Pathiyoor is a village in Kayamkulam city in the Indian state of Kerala.The village will be northern part of this city.

Notable people
Thachadi Prabhakaran, Indian politician

Demographics
At the 2001 India census, Pathiyoor (Village) had a population of 22,184 with 10,461 males and 11,723 females.

See also 

 Panchayath High School, Pathiyoor

References

Villages in Alappuzha district